A total lunar eclipse took place on Monday, September 15, 1913. The moon passed through the center of the Earth's shadow.

Visibility

Related lunar eclipses

Inex series

Saros series

Half-Saros cycle
A lunar eclipse will be preceded and followed by solar eclipses by 9 years and 5.5 days (a half saros). This lunar eclipse is related to two total solar eclipses of Solar Saros 133.

See also
List of lunar eclipses
List of 20th-century lunar eclipses

Notes

External links

1913-09
1913-09
1913 in science
September 1913 events